Elections to Strathclyde Regional Council were held on Tuesday 7 May 1974, on the same day as the eight other Scottish regional elections. This was the first election to the regional council following the implementation of the Local Government (Scotland) Act 1973.

The election used the 103 electoral divisions created by the Formation Electoral Arrangements in 1974. Each electoral division elected one councillor using first-past-the-post voting.

Labour took control of the regional council after winning a large majority of the seats. The party won 71 of the 103 seats and took 44% of the popular vote. The Conservatives were the second-largest party after winning 20 seats. The Scottish National Party (SNP) came third in the popular vote and took five seats. The Liberal Party took two seats while the other five were won by independent candidates.

Background
Prior to reform, local government in Scotland was made up of a system of counties and burghs. County councils controlled most of the local government functions across the country while the burghs had limited powers over smaller geographical areas. Small burghs had some control over planning as well as local taxation, building control, housing, lighting and drainage while large burghs also had further powers over the police, public health, social services, registration of births, marriages and deaths and electoral registration.

Following the recommendations in the Wheatly Report, the old system of counties and burghs – which had resulted in a mishmash of local government areas in which some small burghs had larger populations but far fewer responsibilities than some large burghs and even counties – was to be replaced by a new system of regional and district councils.

The area that was to become Strathclyde was made up of the former counties of Ayrshire, Buteshire, Dunbartonshire, Lanarkshire and Renfrewshire in full as well as the City of Glasgow, most of Argyll and part of Stirlingshire.

Results

Source:

Electoral division results

Argyll District

Dumbarton District

City of Glasgow District

Clydebank District

Bearsden & Milngavie District

Bishopbriggs & Kirkintilloch District

Cumbernauld District

Monklands District

Motherwell District

Kilmarnock North

Kilmarnock South

Stewarton and Irvine Valley

Cumnock

New Cumnock and Doon Valley

References

1974 Scottish local elections
1974